Alfredo Hernández Raigosa (12 January 1963 – 29 June 2022) was a Mexican politician. He served as a member of the Chamber of Deputies of Mexico from 2000 to 2003. Raigosa died in June 2022, at the age of 59.

References 

1963 births
2022 deaths
Place of death missing
Party of the Democratic Revolution politicians
Morena (political party) politicians
Members of the Chamber of Deputies (Mexico)
Deputies of the LVIII Legislature of Mexico
21st-century Mexican politicians
Politicians from Mexico City